MapJack is a map feature introduced in 2007 that is similar to Google Street View, but has less coverage than Google Street View. Its current headquarters is in Hong Kong, and is in the beta stages. The site currently provides these types of views of various locations in the United States, Thailand, Sweden and Canada. It was only the second to provide such views of an area outside the United States when Chiang Mai was introduced.

Although the domain and URL resolve to the official website, the page requires Adobe_Flash, which was end-of-life in 2021.  In July 2018, Google changed their Google Maps API pricing model, and any website using a license that was previously free would see their website stop working.  Both the Flash and the Google Maps API pricing has affected the MapJack website, rendering it inoperable.

Regions included

Awards
MapJack was awarded one of the 50 best web sites of 2008 by Time magazine, describing the service as "brighter, sharper photos than the others, and better navigation tools ... MapJack offers the best preview of the future of digital mapping".

References

External links 
Official Website

Street view services